John Reck was an Alaskan politician and the ninth mayor of Juneau, Alaska, from 1914 to 1916.

References

1865 births
1951 deaths
American bank presidents
American merchants
Burials at Evergreen Cemetery (Juneau, Alaska)
Mayors of Juneau, Alaska
People from Elkader, Iowa